Mount Mariveles is a dormant stratovolcano and the highest point in the province of Bataan in the Philippines. Mariveles and the adjacent Mount Natib comprise 80.9 percent of the total land area of the province.  The mountain and adjacent cones lie opposite the city of Manila across Manila Bay, providing a beautiful setting for the sunsets seen from the city.

Location
Mount Mariveles lies at the southern end of the Zambales Mountains in the Bataan Peninsula, west of Manila Bay. Bataan province belongs to the Central Luzon (Region III), of the Philippines.

Physical features
Mount Mariveles is a massive stratovolcano topped with a  summit caldera which drains to the north. The highest peak, called Mariveles, has an elevation of  asl.

Mount Samat on the northern slope, and Mount Limay on the eastern slope, are major, youthful-looking parasitic cones of the volcano.

Mariveles is still thermally active with the following hot springs located within the complex: Tiis Spring, Saysain Spring, and Pucot Spring.

Eruptions
There are no recorded historical eruptions from Mariveles caldera. However, archeologists report the last active eruption indicated by radiocarbon dating occurring around mid-Holocene or about 2050 BCE.

Geology

Rock type is predominantly biotite, hornblende, and andesite, with dacite flows and dacitic tuffs similar to nearby Mount Natib.

Mount Mariveles is on the Western Bataan Lineament volcanic belt of Luzon, which includes Mount Pinatubo, site of the second largest eruption of the last 20th century.

Listings

The Philippine Institute of Volcanology and Seismology (PHIVOLCS), the Philippine government branch that deals with volcanology in the country, lists Mariveles as a potentially active volcano for the age of its last eruption and active thermal features.

Climbing Mariveles

There are already three peaks familiar to the local mountaineering community, namely Tarak Ridge, Pantingan or Banayan Peak, and Mariveles Ridge. The rest of the peaks in the caldera are still waiting to be explored.

Tarak Ridge is the more well-known destination on Mount Mariveles, with its jump-off point situated at Barangay Alas-asin, Mariveles, Bataan. Pantingan Peak (locally called Banayan Peak) can be accessed through Sitio Duhat, Saysain, Bagac, Bataan. Mariveles Ridge can be accessed through Sitio Parca, Mariveles, Bataan.

See also
 List of volcanoes in the Philippines
 List of active volcanoes in the Philippines
 List of potentially active volcanoes in the Philippines
 List of inactive volcanoes in the Philippines
 Pacific ring of fire

References

External links
 Philippine Institute of Volcanology and Seismology (PHIVOLCS), Mariveles page (archived)
 
 Mariveles Mountain Range from MyBataan
 Climbing Mount Mariveles through Tarak Ridge from Pinoy Mountaineer

Stratovolcanoes of the Philippines
Subduction volcanoes
Volcanoes of Luzon
Mountains of the Philippines
Landforms of Bataan
Potentially active volcanoes of the Philippines
Pliocene stratovolcanoes
Pleistocene stratovolcanoes